E66 may refer to:
 E 66 road (United Arab Emirates)
 European route E66
 Nokia E66 smartphone
 BMW E66 car
 Enercon E-66, a wind turbine
 E66, the ICD-10 code for obesity